Twelfth grade, 12th grade, senior year, or grade 12 is the final year of secondary school in most of the world. It may also be referred to as class 12 or Year 13. In most countries, students are usually between the ages of 17 and 18 years old. Some countries have a thirteenth grade, while other countries do not have a 12th grade/year at all. Twelfth grade is typically the last year of high school (graduation year).

Australia
In Australia, the twelfth grade is referred to as Year 12. In New South Wales, students are usually 16 or 17 years old when they enter Year 12 and 17 or 18 years during graduation (end of year). A majority of students in Year 12 work toward getting an ATAR (Australian Tertiary Admission Rank). Up until the start of 2020 the OP (Overall Position, which applies only to students in the state of Queensland) was used. Both of these allow/allowed them access to courses at university. In Western Australia, this is achieved by completing the WACE; in South Australia, this is achieved by completing the SACE; in Victoria, this is achieved by completing the VCE; in the Australian Capital Territory, this is achieved by completing the AST and in New South Wales this is achieved by completing the HSC.

In New South Wales, when completing the [HSC], students are required to satisfactorily complete at least 10 units of study in ATAR courses which must include:
 eight units from Category A courses
 two units of English
 three Board Developed courses of two units or greater
 four subjects

Some Year 12s may receive a Year 12 Jersey. Schools choose the design, colors, and writing which are printed or stitched onto the Jersey. Sometimes the last two digits of the year they are graduating are printed on the back (for example, "12" for 2012 school leavers) along with a personalized nickname or surname. The front may show the school emblem and the student's name, which is occasionally stitched in.

Many schools conduct end of year "formals" (similar to a senior prom). They are held from any time between graduation from September to November. Australian private schools often conduct Year 12 Formals in January or February of Year 12 instead of an end of year formal.

Bangladesh
In Bangladesh, educational institutions offering the 11th–12th grade education are known as colleges. In the 12th grade, students study in one of the three streams: science, humanities, and business studies. After completing 12th grade, they have to sit for the Higher Secondary Certificate (HSC) examinations.

Belgium
In Belgium, the 12th grade is called 6de middelbaar or laatste jaar in Dutch, rhéto or 6e secondaire in French. In the General Education, this year guides and prepares students for their first year in University by recalling everything learned during the past six years of secondary school. In Skills Education, this year prepares the students for professional life with an Internship in the chosen domain.

Brazil

In Brazil, the twelfth grade is the "terceiro ano do ensino médio", meaning "third grade of high school", being the last grade of high school. It is typically attended by 17–18 years old students. During this grade, most students apply in the Exame Nacional do Ensino Médio, and exame vestibular, the entrance examinations to education institutions.

Bulgaria
In Bulgaria the twelfth grade is the last year of high-school. Twelfth-grade students tend to be 18 years old. Usually, students are preparing to take the Matriculation exam in the end of their 2nd semester.

Canada
In Canada, the twelfth grade is referred to as Grade 12. Students generally enter their Grade-12 year when they are 16-or 17-years old. If they are 16-years old, they will be turning 17 by December 31 of that year. Thus, students in Canada generally graduate high school at 17-or 18-years old. In many Canadian high schools, students in their Grade-12 year hold a series of fundraisers, grade-class trips, and other social events. Grade-12 Canadian students attend Graduation which usually involves an official ceremony.

Quebec is the only province that does not have Grade 12; their students finish secondary school at the equivalent of Grade 11, and then do two years of college before going to university. Thus, when a student is in Grade 12 in Ontario, for instance, the student in Quebec is in their first year of college.

Ontario previously had Grade 13 from 1921 to 1988, at which point it was replaced by the Ontario Academic Credit (OAC). While the Ontario Academic Credit was technically optional and not required in order to receive an Ontario Secondary School Diploma, it was required to enter university. The OAC was phased out in 2003, leaving Grade 12 as the final year of secondary education for all Ontario students.

Newfoundland and Labrador did not introduce Grade 12 until 1983.

Denmark

In Denmark, the twelfth grade is the 3rd G, which is the final year of secondary school. 3.g is equivalent to 3rd grade of secondary school, or gymnasium. This is not compulsory, as education is only compulsory through 9th grade. Students are often 18-19 or older when they finish secondary school. The age of graduation is caused by the fact that Danish children first start school at 6. The reason that many students will be at the age of 20 when they graduate is because some people choose to have one-year gap between the 9th grade and gymnasium's 1st G (the first year of secondary school), where students typically go to special art- or sport-oriented boarding schools or become exchange students all over the world. This is optional though; you can go directly to the first year of secondary school after 9th grade.

Finland
The twelfth grade is the third and usually last year (a fourth-year is possible) of high school or secondary school (or Gymnasium) The students graduate from high school usually around 18, with some 17 or 19. The twelfth grade is shorter than the previous ones because the twelfth graders' lessons end in February and they go on to take their final exams shortly afterward. Compulsory education ends after the twelfth grade, and it is completely optional for a student to continue into fourth-year.

France
The equivalent grade in France is Terminale. It is the third and last year of lycée (the French equivalent to high school), whereby students must sit a test called the Baccalauréat to complete the year. French-language schools that teach the French government curriculum (i.e. are part of the AEFE network) use the same system of grades as their French counterparts. This is not compulsory, as education in France is only compulsory until students turn 16.

Germany
In Germany, students wishing to take the Abitur usually had to attend the thirteenth grade, but most states are shortening the Gymnasium (the university-bound secondary school system in Germany) from nine to eight years. But the recent tendency is re-introduction of the thirteenth year, as in Bavaria.

Greece
In Greece, the twelfth (12th) grade is called the third year of lyceum school or high school or upper secondary school (Triti Lykeiou – Τρίτη Λυκείου).

Hong Kong
In Hong Kong, 12th grade is called Form 6. Form 6 students are required to take the Hong Kong Diploma of Secondary Education, also known as HKDSE.

Hungary
In Hungary, students take a national exam called érettségi (lit. "maturity test") at the end of their 12th grade, except for certain vocational schools, where they only take a vocational exam. The érettségi exam consists of standard school subjects, everyone has to take an exam of literature and grammar, mathematics, and history, and they have to choose 2 other subjects, one of which has to be a foreign language, and, in most vocational schools, the other is a mixed test of vocational knowledge.

12th-grade students often participate in graduation ceremonies before the érettségi exam. In most schools, there is a full-day ceremony on Friday or Saturday before the exam, which is called ballagás (lit. "going away", or "exiting"). In many schools, students attend other ceremonies during their 12th grade as well. For example, many schools hold a szalagavató event (lit. "ribbon commencement") at the beginning of the school year, where 12th graders receive a ribbon or a similar emblem with the name of their high school and the beginning and closing year of their studies there, which they later wear on their coats. 12th-grade students also often visit their teachers before the final exam, traditionally in the evening, either at their home or in the school, to sing them in the street below, and say farewell. This tradition is simply called szerenád. They also often take choir rehearsals before to learn how to sing together.

India

In India, the Twelfth Grade is the final year of higher secondary education and it is also the final year of High School in almost in all National and State Boards in India and In some State Boards in India it is the second year of Junior College. The equivalent grade for the this grade is commonly known as "Class 12" or "Plus 2". Generally Twelfth Grade is known as "+2" which originates from the term "10+2". It is also called as “Intermediate 2nd Year” (Intermediate Course), "HSC" (Higher Secondary Certificate), "SYJC" (Second Year Junior College), “2nd PUC”(2nd Year Pre- University Course) in different regions and states. Also students in Class 12 write board exams at the end of every academic year which is conducted by various National and State Boards of India in order to gain the admission for higher education in various Universities across the globe. In India, most states consisting of school educational boards like national and state boards (i.e CBSE, CISCE, NIOS and different state boards) provide schooling till Class 12th and it is the final year of school except these states(Telangana, Andhra Pradesh, Karnataka, Uttar Pradesh, Assam, Odisha, Maharashtra, Bihar) where these state boards provide schooling only till Class 10th and the students have to apply to Junior Colleges or Pre-University Colleges or Else have to join High School which is affiliated to CBSE, CISCE & NIOS to complete their Class 11th and Class 12th. Students entering Class 12 are usually 16–18 years old. The CBSE and CISCE boards issue course and examination guidelines for Class 10 and 12 nationally, while the various state boards operate at the state-level.

Students participate in a party organized by the school and junior college in some regions and states known as Farewell Function, quite similar to prom, at the end of the session.

After finishing twelfth grade, students usually apply for entrance examinations for entry into medicine, engineering, law, Bachelor of Science, Bachelor of Commerce, Bachelor of Humanities or various other bachelor's courses. Entrance exams usually consist of multiple-choice-questions and are conducted at national and state levels. Additionally, some institutions hold their own entrance tests. After 3 (in some courses 4 and sometimes 5) years of Bachelor's course, they get a bachelor's degree and are eligible to pursue a master's degree at 21 ( or 22) years of age.

Indonesia
In Indonesia, the twelfth grade is the third and last year of High School. High school graduates can continue their education to college or go straight to work.

Ireland
In the Republic of Ireland, it is the sixth and final year of Secondary School, referred to as Sixth Year (for 17-18-year-olds), in which students take the Leaving Certificate Examinations. Students usually attend a dance or formal party at the end of this year before they move on to third-level education or start their adult lives: this is known as a Debs, Grad or Prom and is similar to prom in the United States.

Israel
In Israel, the twelfth grade is the third and last year of High School. Students typically begin this grade when they are about 17 years old, and in order to graduate, they have to pass and get a Bagrut certificate.

Italy
In Italy, the twelfth grade is the fourth year of the high school (which is called Scuola Superiore or Scuola secondaria di secondo grado). There are five years of high school total, sometimes grouped in different ways (2+3, 2+1+2), depending on the type of high school the student is attending. Students get the "Maturità", when they are in the fifth year of high school, de facto the thirteenth grade.

Lebanon
In Lebanon, the twelfth grade is the third year of high school, also referred to as The Third Year Of Higher Secondary Education. It can be called the class of seniors or the last class of the school. People in the twelfth grade are between the ages of 17 and 18.

Malaysia
In Malaysia, the 12th grade is also known as Form 6 in a secondary school which is further divided into Lower 6 and Upper 6. The students at this stage are 18 years old and will usually complete their schooling at 19 years old. Students generally complete their schooling at 17, or Form 5, however Form 6 is an option for students to pursue after Form 5, among other options such as matriculation and other pre-university courses.

Mexico
In Mexico, the twelfth grade is the last year of high school, where students are normally aged 17–18. As in Mexico, the education is divided in "primaria" (6 years), "secundaria" (3 years) and "preparatoria" or "bachillerato" (3 years), the twelfth grade is usually called "tercero de preparatoria" (third grade of preparatory) or "Quinto y Sexto Semestre" (Fifth and Sixth Semester).

Netherlands
In the Netherlands, 12th grade is named by the school level. From low to high: "VMBO", "HAVO" and "VWO". VMBO is composed of four years, with 12th grade being the fourth (4th) and final year. A higher school level is the HAVO, which lasts for five years. The highest school level is VWO, which lasts for six years. So at the HAVO, students are considered senior if they are in "5th class", whereas at VWO, in "6th class" respectively. The last year mainly focuses on preparing for the final exams, after which students should be ready to go to college or university. Usually, 4th and 5th grade students are aged 16 to 17 and those who are in 6th grade usually are aged 17 to 18.

New Zealand
In New Zealand, 12th grade is known as Year 13 (New Zealand students attend 13 years of school, starting at the age of 5). Students in Year 13 are usually 17–18 years old. This is the last year of secondary school. In Year 13, students complete NCEA Level 3, which involves getting a certain number of 'credits' from different external exams and other internal assessments. Students must gain 80 achieved credits or higher (20 of which are taken from Level 2) to pass the year.

Norway

In Norway, 12th grade does not officially exist, but its equivalent is the 2nd grade of secondary school or gymnasium. This is not compulsory, as education is only compulsory until 10th grade.

Courses vary as students choose a specific program in 1st grade of secondary school or gymnasium. Examples of programs are General Studies, Media and Communication, Health and Care, Industrial work, Design and craftmanship, economics, or agriculture. There are 12 national programs, where 9 will get the students ready for work, and 3 will prepare the students for more advanced studies. Two of the vocational programs (media and communication, and agriculture) may also prepare the students for more advanced studies if taken the third year.

Pakistan
In Pakistan, the twelfth grade is the second year of college (the first being the eleventh grade) and is equivalently called the "second year." Students who graduate from the second year are normally between seventeen and eighteen years old. For entrance into universities, students undergo standardized exams like ECAT, MDCAT and exams conducted by the NTS.

Philippines

Grade 12 is the final year of Senior High School and High School curriculum under the new K–12 program that was first implemented in June 6, 2011. It is also the last year of High School, as well as the basic and compulsory education in the country before graduates choose to enter tertiary education (e.g. college or university, which are both used interchangeably), entrepreneurship, or employment. Students are usually 17–18 years old.

From 1945 to June 5, 2011, the Philippines had only ten years of required education and divided into two stages, the first being six years of Elementary School and four years of High School. Stage also had a different numbering system and students graduated at 4th Year. The historic 4th Year is equivalent to Form 4 in neighboring Malaysia, tenth grade in North America, and Year Eleven in the United Kingdom, Australia and New Zealand.

Subjects on Grade 12 are enrolled on a semestral basis as in Grade 11. Afterwards, Grade 12 students will take the last National Achievement Test called the Basic Education Exit Assessment, although this is not a requirement for graduation or college enrollment. Finally, graduation rites are held, being the next grade to do so after Grade 6 for elementary school graduates.

Portugal
In Portugal, the 12th grade is considered the last year of compulsory education and the last year of high school. Students choose 5 out of a wide range of subjects, one of which being mandatorily physical education. Out of the other four, two of them are the subjects that will be evaluated in their final exams or national exams (exams national), one must be considered a branch of one of the two subjects that have been already evaluated in the 11th grade national exams and the last can be a broadening of an already studied subject or a whole new one. The obligatory subjects (submitted to Nacional exams) depend on the field the student chose to study in the 10th grade:arts; science and technologies (best known as science);socioeconomic sciences (economy); humanistic and linguistic sciences (humanities) or a professional/technical course. Even inside a field, you can opt between specifics (subjects, whose exam is compulsory to a certain college course application), depending on what the student intends to study in college and on which university he plans to attend.

South Africa

In South Africa, Grade 12 is the final year of high school. It is more commonly referred to as matric, which is itself short for matriculation. (See Matriculation in South Africa).

At the end of Grade 12, students are said to be matriculated. This also refers to the minimum requirement for progressing to University. On average, Grade 12 students start the year at 17 and turn 18 within the time leading up to matriculation.

Spain
The closest equivalent to twelfth grade in Spain is the second year of Bachillerato, required for attending college.

Sweden

In Sweden, the twelfth grade does not officially exist, but its equivalent is the 2nd grade of secondary school or gymnasium. This is not compulsory, as education is only compulsory until 9th grade.

Courses vary as students choose a specific program in 1st grade of secondary school or gymnasium. Examples of programs are Nature and Science, Humanities, Arts, Economics, Health and care, Industry. There are 18 national programs, where 12 of them will get the students ready for work, and 6 will prepare the students for more advanced studies.

Students graduate the same year they'll turn 19, depending on if you are born early or late in the year you are either 19 or 18 at the day of your graduation.

Turkey

In Turkey, 12th grade is the last year of high school and compulsory education. In June, students who are interested to go to college take a test named Temel Yeterlilik Testi (TYT)(Basic Sufficiency Test). In this exam, students have to answer 120 questions (40 Turkish, 30 Maths, 10 Geometry, 5 History, 5 Geography, 5 Philosophy, 5 Religious Knowledge, 6 Biology, 7 Physics, 7 Chemistry) in 165 minutes.Students,if they didn't receive any Religious Knowledge courses will instead have to answer another set of 5 Philosophy questions.
One day after this test, most students will take the Alan Yeterlilik Testi (AYT) (Branch Sufficiency Test).This exam also has different sessions for different branches, which include Mathematics, Geometry, Physics, Chemistry, Biology, Turkish Literature, History, Geography, Philosophy, Religious Knowledge. The Test takes 180 minutes. It is not compulsory to take all of the subjects. Foreign Languages Test is separate to the Branch Sufficiency Test. Students usually are at the age of 18 at the end of the year.

United Kingdom

England and Wales
In England and Wales, "Year 13" (or "upper Sixth") is the last year of A-Level certifications which are completed to finalise a student's last academic year. Students are usually 16–17 in Year 12 and 17–18 in Year 13. While the school leaving age in the rest of the UK is 16 years old, in 2015 education in England became compulsory until the age of 18. After this age, students can leave education if they choose without necessarily completing year 13. Between the ages of 16 and 18, students can either continue in full-time education (for example, at a sixth form college); start an apprenticeship or traineeship; or spend a minimum of 20 hours per week working or volunteering while in part-time education or training. Any education after the age of 18 is then referred to as higher education.

Scotland
In Scotland, this is the sixth year (or S6). Sufficiently good marks in 5th year may be adequate for entry into higher education. 'Highers' are the entry qualifications to university which can be sat in S5, S6 or college, with Advanced Highers equivalent to year one of university.

Northern Ireland
In Northern Ireland, there is a 7th year of primary school and a 7th year of secondary school.

United States

The twelfth grade is the twelfth school year after kindergarten. It is also the last year of compulsory secondary education, or high school. Students are often 17–18 years old, and on rarer occasions, can be 19 years old. Twelfth graders are referred to as Seniors.

Many students consider the twelfth grade, also known as the senior year of high school, a year to relax and prepare for the transition out of their old lives into college/university or the workplace. Others take advantage of the opportunity to complete additional higher-level courses, such as Advanced Placement and International Baccalaureate, to earn credits for college/university.

Math courses normally include Precalculus, Trigonometry, Advanced Placement Calculus, Advanced Placement Statistics, or Probability.

Science courses include Advanced Placement Chemistry, Advanced Placement Biology, Advanced Placement Environmental Science, or Advanced Placement Physics B, Advanced Placement Physics C: Mechanics, or Advanced Placement Physics C: Electricity and Magnetism.

Social Studies courses include Government, Economics, Advanced Placement United States Government and Politics, Advanced Placement Comparative Government and Politics, Advanced Placement Psychology, Advanced Placement European History, Advanced Placement United States History, Advanced Placement Microeconomics, or Advanced Placement Macroeconomics.

English classes include Advanced Placement English Literature and Composition, Film and Literature, Sports and Literature, or Contemporary Literature. Popular works studied include Beowulf, The Canterbury Tales, Pygmalion, The Handmaid's Tale, Frankenstein, Othello, Inferno, Goethe's Faust, Hamlet, and Brave New World, as well as works of Romantic poets such as Edgar Allan Poe, John Keats, William Wordsworth, and Emily Dickinson.

Art classes include Advanced Placement Art History, Advanced Placement Studio Art, Advanced Placement Music Theory, Applied art in Theatre, Music Theory For Garage Band Musicians, IB Musical Analysis, IB Theatre Arts, Advanced Technical Theatre, Advanced Photography, Advanced Ceramics, Fashion Design and Illustration, Theatre Dance, Jazz Dance, IB Dance Studies Madrigal Singers, Jazz Singers, or Wind Ensemble.

Technology classes include Advanced Placement Computer Science, Java, Advanced Web Design, and C++ Programming.

Business classes include College Marketing, College Entrepreneurship, Sports and Entertainment Marketing, College Preparatory Interview Classes, and Advanced Fundamentals in Business.

Wellness classes include Physical Education, Health (if not yet taken), Weightlifting, and Advanced Training in First Aid.

Traditions associated with senior year
In the United States and some other countries, there is a graduation event near to the end of the school year (typically in May or June) more formally referred to as commencement, where seniors formally graduate from high school and receive their diplomas.

In many schools, seniors sit for formal senior portraits at the beginning of the school year or the summer prior to their senior year. These portraits are used in the upcoming graduating class's yearbook. The senior portraits in the yearbook are usually bigger than the ones typically used for lower grades.  Many modern yearbooks are in full color.

There is a formal dance for this year's students, called senior prom. Some schools hold a combined prom for juniors and seniors, while others segregate the two grades into separate dances.

Senior skip day (also known as senior ditch day) is a day during which the seniors do not attend school and skip all their classes. This event/tradition is often not recognized by school administrations and teachers. In some areas it is countered with an officially recognized senior day off, or by allowing graduating seniors to skip their final exams. This official senior day can also be used to sponsor a senior field trip or senior class trip where the class would, for example, go to a theme park, a lake, a resort,  the beach, or some other vacation-type activity. Following graduation, many seniors go on senior week, where they spend a week at the beach with their friends.

In some schools, Seniors receive a class ring at the beginning of their senior year. A senior prank is another common tradition in which the class may contribute towards a practical joke on the school,  administration, or local community. A related tradition is the senior class either raising money or contributing money for equipment or other things to the school as a token of gratitude and respect for the school's support of the seniors. A similar project could involve the outside local community as well.

See also
Educational stage
Eleventh Grade
Senioritis
Senior secondary education

References

12
Secondary education